This list of Oregon covered bridges contains 50 historic covered bridges remaining in the U.S. state of Oregon.

Most covered bridges in Oregon were built between 1905 and 1925.  At its peak, there were an estimated 450 covered bridges, which by 1977, had dwindled to 56. , there were only 49 remaining. Lane County has more covered bridges than any other county west of the Mississippi River.

List

Preservation efforts
In 2008, The National Historic Covered Bridge Preservation Program, administered by the Federal Highway Administration, awarded grants for rehabilitation of seven covered bridges in Oregon.

Gallery

See also

 List of bridges on the National Register of Historic Places in Oregon
 Lists of Oregon-related topics

Footnotes

References
General references

 The Covered Bridge Society of Oregon
 Oregon Covered Bridge Society

Specific citations

External links

Oregon covered bridges
Oregon covered bridges supplemental PDF

 
Bridges, covered
Oregon covered bridges
Bridges, covered
Bridges, covered